Airheads is an American brand of the taffy candy owned by the Italian-Dutch company Perfetti Van Melle. They were created on August 7, 1985, by Steve Bruner. Airheads are available nationwide in the United States and Canada where the candy is available in 16 different flavors.

Company
Perfetti Van Melle has been based in Erlanger, Kentucky since 1979; in 1982, the company started making candy-based products. It is a 120,000-square-foot factory that currently has 200 employees.

In December 2015, an explosion occurred at the factory, causing it to catch fire. Nobody was harmed in the explosion, but production was halted periodically.

Flavors

The candy comes individually wrapped in long colored strips, in the flavors of:

Cherry (red)
Blue Raspberry (blue)
Watermelon (green)
Green Apple (light green)
Strawberry (pink)
White Mystery (white)
Orange (orange)
Grape (purple)
Lemon (yellow) (Coming Soon)
Pink Lemonade (light pink)
Strawberry-Watermelon (pink and green striped)
Mango-Chili (orange with red dots)
Blue Raspberry-Cherry (blue and red striped)
Double Mystery (2 random colors striped)
Maple (light brown, Canada only)
Pink Lemonade-Orange (light pink and orange striped)
Strawberry-Lime
Salted Watermelon
Birthday Cake (white with colored sprinkles)
Special Edition White Mystery (white)
Cotton Candy Bubble Gum (light pink)
Fruit Punch (red)
Citrus Rush (yellow-green)
Chocolate (brown)

The above flavors are also available in mini-size. Special edition flavors, such as Superman, SpongeBob and Spider-Man, are sold as promotions. "Airheads Xtremes" a, spinoff version of the candy, are fruit rolls with a sour taste. Airheads Pops are lollipops available in the flavors of apple, blue raspberry, strawberry, cherry, watermelon, grape, strawberry kiwi and berry.

In 2007, a flavor called BerryHot was introduced that claims to "heat up in your mouth".

In 2008, "Chillin flavors" were released as another version of the candy. Airheads "Blue Mystery Blast bars" were distributed to travelers on JetBlue Airways on October 31, 2007, in celebration of Halloween.

In June 2013, "Airheads bites" were released. They are tiny Airheads flavored candy items in a candy shell. The flavors included in this version of the candy are "Cherry", "Orange", "Blue Raspberry", "Watermelon", and "Mystery". In the initial release there was a "berry variety" but the flavor has since been discontinued.

Perfetti Van Melle partnered with Koldwave Foods LLC to create "Airheads ice cream" in August 2015. The ice-cream came in 8 different flavors: "blue raspberry", "cherry", "watermelon", "orange", "green apple", "pink lemonade", "grape", and "strawberry". Ice cream sandwiches and sundae cups were also produced with the same flavor options. In November 2019, "Airheads Paradise Blends" were released, which contained a set of four tropical flavors: "Cherry Pineapple Blast" (red), "Raspberry Lemonade" (pink), "Citrus Rush" (green), and "Blue Hawaiian" (blue), along with "White Mystery" bars.

Nutritional facts
A normal  pack of Airheads is 360 calories, 51 grams of sugar, and 3 grams of saturated fat. "Airheads Xtremes Sweetly Sour Belts" ( is 300 calories, 45 grams of sugar, and 0 grams of saturated fat.

A single  Airheads is 60 calories, 11 grams of sugar, and 0 grams of saturated fat.

Production
Airheads are made by creating long strips, similar to the method used to manufacture Play-Doh. The main ingredient is sugar. Airheads uses taffy as one of its main ingredients which allows it to be quite malleable. The candy is manufactured on a conveyor belt, where the taffy goes through sugars and sweeteners leading to a thinning, forming, and packaging process. The machines stir about 3,000 pounds of taffy.

Distribution
Airheads were originally sold across Canada and the United States but an expansion into the United Kingdom was announced in 2015. "Airheads Xtremes" and "Bars" are manufactured in the US and "Airheads Pops" are manufactured and sold in Mexico and Spain.

Advertising
It was reported that Perfetti Van Melle spent $2.5 million on media exposure in 1999.

In 2000, Perfetti Van Melle started a partnership with Mattel to use targeted advertising against children in USA. The advertisements ran on children's programming networks like Fox Kids and Nickelodeon to continue Airheads' already existing "Out of Control" campaign. The advertisements offered sweepstakes to Disneyland, as well as coupons on the back of Airhead packets for Mattel's "X-V Xtreme Skateboarders".

In 2003, commercials started airing on Nickelodeon. Airheads.nick.com held a poll, advertising the green flavor, a trademark of the network.

References 

Brand name confectionery
Perfetti Van Melle brands
Products introduced in 1985
American brands
American confectionery